Motorcity is an American animated television series created by Chris Prynoski. It is produced by Titmouse, Inc. and Disney Television Animation. The series ran from April 30, 2012 to January 7, 2013 on Disney XD.

On November 5, 2012, the series was cancelled after one season.

Synopsis
This show occurs in a fictitious futuristic Detroit, which is an elevated metropolis built over the old Detroit, classified as Detroit Deluxe. It is owned by evil billionaire Abraham Kane (Mark Hamill). Ruling the citizens under strict laws, and banning personal freedoms including automobile transportation, Kane now faces one last obstacle: a group of hot-rod wielding rebels who call themselves the Burners. Led by Kane's former cadet Mike Chilton (Reid Scott), the Burners rise to stop Kane from conquering Detroit's last oasis of freedom—an underground refuge dubbed Motorcity.

Characters

Protagonists

The Burners
 Mike Chilton (voiced by Reid Scott) – The leader of the Burners and the main protagonist of the series. Mike is a cool, quick-witted, funny, gutsy, kind, impulsive 17-year-old who does things his own way and usually has things under control. He takes very few things seriously, except for his mission of taking down Kane, and easily keeps his team ready for whatever Kane throws their way. He used to work as Kane's cadet before Kane's cruel nature drove him to quit and fight against him as a Motorcity rebel.
 Julie Kane (voiced by Kate Micucci) – The Burners' infiltration expert and inside connection to KaneCo., using her "internship" there to gather info on Kane's plots. She is highly skilled and has a strong sense of patience that allows her to see the best in people. Unknown to her Burner teammates, she is actually Kane's daughter, though she makes it no secret that she is against her father's wicked crusade.
 Chuck (voiced by Nate Torrence) – Mike's best friend and computer expert for the Burners. Thanks to his large brain, Chuck can always find an escape route or solution to whatever problem the Burners are in, and is usually improving the Burners' computer and security systems. Although he's usually terrified of whatever dangerous situation Mike has put him in, he's incredibly loyal. He's the only Burner who can't drive, and fears rejection from the others if they ever found out.
 Dutch Gordy (voiced by Kel Mitchell) – The Burners' creative technological genius. Having escaped Kane's futuristic empire, Dutch is wary of Deluxe and hates to go back, even to fight Kane. He is initially mistrustful of others, but is likable after getting to know him and his knowledge and loyalty makes him a steadfast teammate. Dutch is an artist at heart and values solitude when pursuing his passion, but he's always ready to upgrade the Burners' hot rods with one of his latest weapons or gadgetry.
 Texas  (voiced by Jess Harnell) – Loveable yet somewhat stupid, Texas is a violent, gung-ho powder keg who is dedicated to the Burners and his fierce determination usually makes him the first one on the battlefield when a fight breaks out. Texas is never the voice of dissent and tends not to think twice before charging in and smashing something with any body part that's armed and ready. He is noted to be Mike's self-appointed second-in-command and dreams of one day leading the Burners, but would never question Mike's authority without a reason. He often speaks in 3rd person and yells his name when attacking foes.
 Jacob (voiced by Brian Doyle-Murray) – A hippie type in his mid-60s and Kane's former partner (a relationship that ended when Kane got all megalomaniacal). He's full of scientific and technological knowledge, which is often buried under organic food talk.
 R.O.T.H. – Dutch's cube-shaped robot assistant who has helped the team on a number of occasions. He was one of Kane's attack bots until Dutch reprogrammed him as his helper. He has been shown to have a phobia of metal-destroying things, like miniature robots that disintegrate metal.

Allies
 Claire (voiced by Dana Davis) – Julie's best friend and confidant for her dual identities. Claire is a sort of "valley-girl" who lives in Deluxe and has shown to be uncomfortable in the slums of Motorcity, considering it 'weird' and 'scary'. As of her second appearance, she states Chuck is the least weirdest thing about the Burners.
 Dr. Hudson (voiced by Jim Cummings) – A scientist who was Jacob's student when KaneCo was trying to help people. He stayed while Jacob left when Kane started pushing them into more "dangerous" experiments. After being rescued by the Burners and making amends with Jacob, Hudson now assumedly assists them in his new lab in Motorcity.
 Rayon (voiced by Bumper Robinson) – The Leader of a gang called the Skylarks, the owner of the Skylark Motel and a regular client of the Burners. Rayon believes The Burners (Especially Mike) to be his allies and trust them much more than some of the other gangs in Motorcity. He is always willing to give Mike information or help when it does not interfere with his business.
 Darr Gordy (voiced by Roshon Fegan) – Dutch's brother and new cadet to Kane. At first he planned on turning in the Burners, but after seeing Dutch save some Deluxians he reconsidered and was made a Burner...technically. He is now another inside connection to Kane.
 Tennie (voiced by Aimee Garcia) – An engineer and love interest of Dutch. She, her father, Bracket (Voiced by Carlos Alazraqui) and the Burners worked together to defend her home against Kane's bots.
 Foxy (voiced by Jennifer Hale) – The Leader of the Amazons, an all girl gang in Motorcity that specializes in fast and high tech vehicles that resemble Formula One Cars. She is somewhat distrusting of the Burners but becomes more of an ally after befriending Claire even helping save them from the Duke.

Antagonists
 Abraham Kane (voiced by Mark Hamill) – The billionaire owner of Detroit Deluxe who serves as the main antagonist of the series. Kane is a wicked, megalomaniac industrialist who was responsible for building the new Detroit called Detroit Deluxe atop the old one, now named Motorcity. He is determined to take over all of Detroit, and plans to do so by wiping out the Motorcity population. People should never forget he absolutely loves his job. He has no regard for the citizens of Motorcity, shown as to go so far as to demolish a building with people inside.
 Tooley (voiced by Jim Breuer) – Kane's dimwitted but loyal right-hand man. What Tooley lacks in competence or intelligence, he makes up for in strength, blind loyalty, and devotion to Kane and his agenda. He also appears to have a crush on Julie which she will at times exploit to gain information from him to assist the Burners.
 Kaia (voiced by Laraine Newman) – The leader of an eco-friendly resistance group called "Terra" who live in a village outside Detroit that was destroyed by KaneCo's waste dumping and fight using rapidly growing mutant plants as their weapons to take revenge on Kane as well as the Deluxe population. As a side effect of the dumping, the Terra themselves had been mutated and are forced to conceal their appearances behind gas masks and headbands. While allied at first, Kaia and her followers are now enemies of the Burners, primarily because of the Terra's attack on innocent Deluxe citizens.
 The Duke of Detroit  (voiced by Dee Snider) – Sometimes friend, sometimes enemy, the Duke is a self-absorbed collector and lover of cars who owns a palace filled with guards and mint condition automobiles. He instructs Mike that respect is conveyed through actions, and when Mike doesn't issue the Duke's kind of respect, he plots to take Mike's car Mutt as a means of payback. The Duke has occasionally put the Burners' rides (and lives) at stake simply for his and others entertainment, going as far as putting the Burners' in a combat situation while they transported a large container with unstable chemicals with the safety mechanisms of said container compromised as part of a reality show staged by him.
 #2 (voiced by Tara Strong) – The Duke's Number 2, Not much is known about her except for the fact that she is extremely devoted to him and is very involved with his plans. She speaks with a New York accent and is always chewing bubble gum.
 Cyborg Dan (voiced by Dave Wittenberg) – A robot who works for The Duke. He seems to be very high up in the Duke's organization but his rank or how he became involved with the Duke is not known. The Duke used him to demonstrate a nuclear reactor for the burners resulting in his face being melted off. He blames Mike for this despite it having almost nothing to do with him.
 Red (voiced by Eric Ladin) – A ghost from Mike's past who was indirectly responsible for Mike coming down to Motorcity. A year ago, he lived in a supposedly abandoned building complex until it was destroyed by an attack from KaneCo. led by Mike. Though Mike betrayed Kane, fought his own men, and rescued the people, he still blames Mike for leading the attack to begin with. He spent the next year training, forging armor, and plotting revenge against Mike; after losing against him, Red joined with Kane and serves as an elite soldier of his, now with upgrades to his suit and weaponry.

Cars
 Mutt – Mike and Chuck's retrofitted green '70s muscle car with four turbine tri-pulsor engines, a slew of energy weapons, a grip of gadgets and a 21st-century chopper hidden between the exhaust pipes.
 9 Lives – Julie's modified yellow mid 21st century police cruiser. Her car can produce decoy hologram-cars to throw pursuers off her trail, cloak to near invisibility, and deploy smoke screens, oil slicks and electromagnetic pulse mines. 9 Lives also has a high precision Sniper Beam under the hood.
 Stronghorn – Texas' black and red six-wheeled race car that is cobbled from the best late 20th century Italian sports cars. Stronghorn is equipped with massive air-powered battering pistons, ram plates and hydro drills. Relies on physical weapons such as a roof-mounted grappling hook and the battering ram which is revealed by splitting open the front grille.
 Whiptail – Dutch's white and purple mid 21st century hot rod that's in a constant state of modification. Dutch is switching the color and welding new things onto it all the time. The speakers incorporated into Whiptail's body can transform into its "sonic spitter", that can shatter armor plating with ear-splitting sound waves. It has also been seen that Whiptail carries ROTH who helps with the car mods and field repairs. Whiptail was destroyed during an attack by KaneBots in the episode "The Duke of Detroit", but it was subsequently rebuilt.
 Blonde Thunder – Chuck's blue seldom-driven, custom-built sports coupe, which was in a state of disrepair until his friends souped it up for a race against the Duke. Unlike the other Burners' vehicles, Blonde Thunder does not have any known weapons or additional equipment, except for a turbo boost. It is unknown if Chuck will ever drive it again.
 Sasquatch – Jacob's blue 20th century chop top, jacked up on monster truck tires with a modified tow truck bed for a rear end.
The Duke's Limos – The Duke of Detroit's limos are old fashioned cars that are stretched out to become limos. However, his primary means of transportation, a monstrosity that drives on massive tank treads, is so large that it fires stretch limos as ammunition.
The Red Car – Red's car which is equipped with smoke bombs, a harpoon and machine guns, as well that Red is very good with car tricks, such as disappearing acts and jumping behind a car behind him. After joining with Kane, Red's car was rebuilt with Deluxian technology, specifically the kind used to build the Enforcer drones, allowing it to shoot powerful lasers and hover rather than ride on normal wheels.

Places
 Motorcity – An underground refuge, consisting of what is left of Old Detroit, that the Burners are protecting.
 North, East, West and South side gates – These gateways are the only way up into Detroit Deluxe from Motorcity.
 Detroit Deluxe – This futuristic city is built on a giant platform that completely covers Old Detroit and the area that surrounds it, and it had the personal freedom of its citizens taken away, but almost nobody living there realizes it. It is most likely to have stemmed from Metro Detroit, spreading across part of southern Michigan.
 The Detroit Doom Jump – This jump has never been made because people regret going on it, then panic and slow down causing them to fall and die.
 Lake Erie – The Burners modified the shore line into a theme park.
 The Burners' Garage – The Burners HQ. It has all of the necessary equipment needed to complete a job or raise a kid.
 The Terra's Village – The home of the Terras. It was once a beautiful and fertile environment until the dumped waste from KaneCo mutated all life there. It is now filled with enormous mushrooms and spores the Terras use for their weapons.
 The Duke's Mansion – A overly large manor that sits atop a hill over a junkyard. It has an obstacle course somewhere nearby.

Episodes

Possible revival 
On April 29, 2013, crew member George Krstic posted a tweet that the studio Titmouse, Inc. was having a meeting on bringing back Motorcity and Megas XLR. Thus far, no meeting nor idea was confirmed.

References

External links
 Motorcity at disneyxdmedianet.com

2012 American television series debuts
2013 American television series endings
2010s American animated television series
2010s American science fiction television series
American children's animated action television series
American children's animated adventure television series
American children's animated science fantasy television series
American children's animated sports television series
American flash animated television series
Disney Channel original programming
Disney XD original programming
Dystopian animated television series
English-language television shows
Television series by Disney Television Animation
Television series created by Chris Prynoski
Animated television series about auto racing
Television shows set in Detroit
Teen animated television series